Chen Chin-sen (born 30 October 1964) is a Taiwanese bobsledder. He competed at the 1988 Winter Olympics and the 1992 Winter Olympics.

References

1964 births
Living people
Taiwanese male bobsledders
Olympic bobsledders of Taiwan
Bobsledders at the 1988 Winter Olympics
Bobsledders at the 1992 Winter Olympics
Place of birth missing (living people)
20th-century Taiwanese people